Petre Moldoveanu (24 June 1925 – 2005) was a Romanian footballer and manager. On 21 November 1948 he played in the first ever CSCA București – Dinamo București derby. He scored the first goal in the 2–1 victory against CSU Cluj in the 1949 Cupa României final, which helped CCA București win the first Cupa României in the club's history.

International career
Petre Moldoveanu played five friendly games at international level for Romania, making his debut in a 4–1 away victory against Albania.

Honours

Player
Steaua București
Divizia A: 1951, 1952, 1953
Cupa României: 1948–49, 1950, 1951, 1952

Manager
Hafia
Ligue 1 Pro: 1975, 1976, 1977
African Cup of Champions Clubs: 1975, runner-up 1976
Guinea
Africa Cup of Nations runner-up: 1976
Universitatea Cluj
Divizia B: 1978–79
Progresul București
Divizia B: 1979–80

References

External links
Petre Moldoveanu at Labtof.ro

1925 births
2005 deaths
Romanian footballers
Romania international footballers
Association football forwards
Liga I players
Liga II players
FC Sportul Studențesc București players
FC Steaua București players
FC Progresul București players
Romanian football managers
Romanian expatriate football managers
FC Progresul București managers
FC Universitatea Cluj managers
Guinea national football team managers
Expatriate football managers in Guinea
1976 African Cup of Nations managers